MRL may refer to:

 Magnetic Reference Laboratory, an American company that makes and sells Calibration Tapes
 Mineral Resources Limited, Australian mining company
 Official Monster Raving Loony Party, a UK political party
 Montana Rail Link, a US railroad
 Merck Research Laboratories, an American pharmaceutical company

Technology related:

 Manufacturing readiness level, a measure of the maturity of the manufacturing readiness of an object of technology related to Technology Readiness Level (TRL)
 Maximum residue limit, a trading standard, usually for pesticide residues on foodstuffs
 Media resource locator, a URI for multimedia
 Multiple rocket launcher
 Murphy Roths large, a strain of mouse, having remarkable tissue regeneration abilities
 Machine room-less elevators